The Silent Stars Go By is a 1991 science fiction book by author James White.

Description on the back cover
The Kingdom of Hibernia had risen from its sleepy emerald isle to befriend the native Redmen of the West, and, with technology brought out of ancient Egyptian lands, had forged a mighty industrial empire. And after generations of development under the Pax Hibernia, the Empire was poised for human-kind's greatest adventure-settling a new world under a distant star.

Healer Nolan was a lone male in the traditionally female healing profession and an unbeliever in the religion of the priest-kings of Hibernia. He had to be careful to avoid any trouble that could jeopardize his place among the crew of the starship Aisling Gheal. But the lowly healer was unaware of his part in a subtle struggle for control of the future colony... until he discovered evidence of a plot against the project: a secret plan for the new world that did not include heretics like Nolan.

And as betrayal and deceit followed Nolan into the silent depths of space and on to the surface of a raw, untamed planet, he was challenged to become the one thing he had never even dreamed of, a hero.

Citations
-http://www.sectorgeneral.com/books/silentstarsgoby.html

-The book itself.

1991 British novels
1991 science fiction novels
Novels by James White (author)
Del Rey books